Remington is a neighborhood in northern Baltimore bordered to the north by Hampden, Wyman Park, and Johns Hopkins University and to the east by Charles Village.  The southernmost boundary is North Avenue and the long southwestern boundary is formed by Falls Road in the I-83 corridor. The  neighborhood is split between two Baltimore City Council Districts (District 14, currently represented by Odette Ramos, and District 12, currently represented by Robert Stokes).

History
Remington shared its early history with other nearby communities that grew up alongside the mills built along the Jones Falls, whose  drop powered grist mills, iron foundries and textile mills. In addition to the water-powered factories along the Jones Falls, quarries in the Remington area operated for over 100 years and provided an enormous amount of stone for the building of Baltimore, furnishing material for thousands of foundations, walls and steps.

The neighborhood was named after William Remington, an early landowner who held property in the center of the area. As the population grew with the mills and quarries, America's first electric railway, built in 1885, brought new residents. Remington became an attractive suburb and was annexed into the city in 1888. Extensive building occurred from 1914 through the 1920s, with daylight and marble row houses being the dominant types. Marble row houses were characterized by their flat or slightly bowed fronts and featured decorative marble and stained glass. The more elaborate daylight row houses became popular in the 1920s and featured a window in each room, often including a skylight in interior rooms.

In 1984, 1,100 households of Appalachian heritage lived in the neighborhood of Remington. Many of these families traced their origins back to coal towns in Western Pennsylvania and hollows in southern West Virginia. These coal-mining families migrated to Baltimore in the 1950s and 1960s, searching for better jobs and better socioeconomic conditions than their parents and grandparents generations had access to. Many of the Appalachian people who settled in Remington worked in factories and mills upon moving to Baltimore. By the 1980s, many of the factories and mills had shut down, resulting in high levels of unemployment. Few wished to relocate back to Appalachia, economic conditions were even worse. One-third of Remington lived in poverty during the early 1980s, many of them under the age of  18. The majority of Appalachian children in Remington at this time did not graduate high school. Due to low voter turn-out, poor Appalachian whites in Remington had little political clout.

A significant portion of the neighborhood was listed on the National Register of Historic Places in 2017 for its architecture and historic significance in the growth of the city.

Subneighborhoods

Due to its elongated shape, Remington is often divided into three distinct subneighborhoods.

Upper Remington refers to the area north of 29th Street, the main westbound arterial street through the area. Upper Remington is adjacent to the Johns Hopkins University and Wyman Park. Although primarily residential in character, it contains many of Remington's notable businesses and landmarks, including Charm City Cakes. Upper Remington's rowhouses tend to hold their value better than other parts of the neighborhood, and have a high rate of homeownership.

Middle Remington refers to the part of the neighborhood bounded by 29th Street on the north and the CSX rail corridor on the south. Middle Remington is more ethnically and racially diverse than the rest of the neighborhood. It is also more commercial in nature, with numerous historical corner businesses, light industrial uses, restaurants, and auto repair shops interspersed among the rowhouses that dominate the neighborhood's housing stock. Middle Remington contains notable institutions such as Papermoon Diner, Mill Valley Garden Center and the Open Space art gallery; recent additions include R House, a new restaurant/food incubator that opened in a former automotive body shop at the corner of 29th Street and Remington Avenue in late 2016, and Remington Row, a mixed-use residential and commercial building located one block south of R House.

Lower Remington (also known as "Fawcett") refers the area south of the CSX rail corridor. The majority of the land area here is commercial and light industrial, but there are also a few blocks of rowhouses that feel secluded due to their isolation from other residential neighborhoods. Lower Remington is directly south of the proposed 25th Street Station development, which will likely transform the character of the area.

Culture
The Broom Factory Factory, a music venue, art space and event destination

Demographics
According to the 2000 Census, there are 2,297 residents living in Remington. 59% are White, 32% are Black, 6% are Asian and 2% are Hispanic).

Education and schools
Parents of school-age children in Remington have a variety of options. Most younger students attend Margaret Brent Elementary/Middle School in nearby Charles Village. Margaret Brent uses a project-based learning curriculum and benefits from high parent involvement, volunteers from organizations such as Americorps and Johns Hopkins and Loyola university students.

Remington also includes several privately run schools. The GreenMount School in Upper Remington is a small K-8 school founded as a parent-run coop school in 1993. The school has about 120 students and follows an experimental, thematic learning curriculum. The school requires an extensive parent commitment to the school: each parent must commit at least 40 hours per year to school-related volunteer work. The Community School is an academic and mentoring state certified nonpublic high school that serves Remington youth as well as young people from surrounding neighborhoods. It was initiated by neighborhood residents over 30 years ago as a tutoring and GED program. The school is known for helping develop students' academic and personal skills with many students going on to college and successful careers.  TCS offers an Education Counseling and Advocacy Program as well as a College Support Program to advise and support individuals with college. More information about the school can be found at its website: www.tcshighschool.org.  Dayspring Head Start provides facilities for some 38 pre-school age children.

Commerce

25th Street Station
25th Street Station was a $70 million mixed-use development planned in the Remington and Charles Village neighborhoods of central Baltimore. The plans were initially revealed in February 2010. The project site is 11 acres and is currently occupied by the Anderson auto dealership, which sells General Motors and Honda cars. GM declined to renew Anderson's contract as part of its restructuring plan, so the auto dealer announced plans to sell the site; these plans, which also included the Honda dealership, resulted in the two Anderson franchises relocating to the northern suburb of Cockeysville, 14 miles from Baltimore. After a lengthy debate throughout most of 2010, the development was given final design approval on December 16, 2010. In the fall of 2011, Lowe's announced it was withdrawing from the project. Construction has yet to begin. In 2014, 25th Street Station's developer, WV Urban Developments, withdrew from the project, citing many legal issues surrounding it, and the site was sold to Seawall Development. The site was leased back to Anderson, who then converted its former GM showroom into a body shop. Seawall Development announced that it would not proceed with the 25th Street Station project as originally planned, leaving it dead.

See also
National Register of Historic Places listings in North and Northwest Baltimore

References

 
Appalachian culture in Baltimore
Historic districts in Baltimore
National Register of Historic Places in Baltimore
Neighborhoods in Baltimore
Working-class culture in Baltimore